Panda diplomacy is the practice of sending giant pandas from China to other countries as a tool of diplomacy. From 1941 to 1984, China gifted pandas to other countries. After a change in policy in 1984, pandas were leased instead of gifted.

Imperial China
While there are few ancient records of the giant panda, “During the Manchu dynasty skins of this animal [bei-shung, presumed to be the panda] were sent as tribute to the government of China by the aborigines of western Szechuan and eastern Tibet,” according to David Crockett Graham,

Republican Era diplomacy

The first instance of Panda Diplomacy in the modern era was arranged by Soong Mei-ling (Madame Chiang) in 1941. China was under siege by Japan, the U.S. had been sending aid to the Kuomintang (Nationalist Government) in China, and Madame Chiang wanted a dramatic way of saying thank you. There had been previous pandas sent to the U.S., including one named Su Lin sold to the Brookfield Zoo in Chicago by Ruth Harkness in 1937, a second one named Mei-Mei brought back by Harkness in 1938 and also sold to the Brookfield Zoo, one named Pandora sent to the Bronx Zoo by David Crockett Graham in 1938, and a second named Pan sent to the Bronx Zoo in 1939. Besides the two live Pandas sent to the Bronx Zoo, Graham had also collected a number of skins and skeletons that that were sent to the Smithsonian. In the summer of 1941, Madame Chiang enlisted David Crockett Graham to capture a live panda. Eventually, two were caught. After spending some time at Graham’s house in Chengdu, they were brought to Chungking where there was to be a radio broadcast before they were sent off to the U.S. William J. Dunn, a CBS radio reporter who happened to be in Chungking at the time, was enlisted to MC the broadcast on XGOY, “Voice of China” radio, to be carried on CBS during prime time in the U.S. Annalee Whitmore, then working as publicity manager for United China Relief, interviewed the participants and wrote the transcript. The broadcast was to include Madame Chiang, her sister Soong Ai-ling (Madame Kung), David Crockett Graham, and John Tee-Van who had just arrived from the Bronx Zoo to take the Pandas to the U.S. The broadcast was to be beamed to RCA communications in Manila and then to San Francisco. At 4am in the morning, Chungking time, in early November, 1941, they were unable to get a response from RCA and went ahead with the broadcast blind. In the end, the atmospheric conditions prevented the broadcast from going through, and the American public had to get the news from the daily press. The Pandas were then flown to Hong Kong under cover of night and from there to the Philippines on the Hong Kong Clipper. From there, they took a circuitous route by ship to San Francisco. Unfortunately, while they were en route, Pearl Harbor was bombed; and, when they arrived in San Francisco, front page news was all about war. While the Pandas did get attention, they weren’t the top of the news across the nation as had been hoped.

Cold War diplomacy
While the Republic of China used giant pandas for diplomatic means as early as 1941, the People's Republic of China began to use panda diplomacy more prominently in the 1950s and has continued the practice into the present day. Between 1957 and 1983, 24 pandas were gifted to 9 nations as gestures of friendship. These nations included the Soviet Union, the Democratic People's Republic of Korea, the United States of America, and the United Kingdom.

When President Nixon visited China in 1972, Mao Zedong promised to send two pandas to an American zoo. In exchange, Nixon gifted two musk oxen to the Chinese. The mutual gifts illustrated the growing diplomatic relationship between China and the United States at the time. Despite the long history of panda diplomacy, the arrival of the pandas in 1972 marked the first time a panda had been in the United States in over twenty years.

Upon the pandas' arrival in April 1972, First Lady Pat Nixon donated them to the National Zoo in Washington, D.C., where she welcomed them in an official ceremony. Over 20,000 people visited the pandas the first day they were on display, and an estimated 1.1 million visitors came to see them the first year they were in the United States. The pandas were wildly popular and China's gift was seen as an enormous diplomatic success, evidence of China's eagerness to establish official relations with the U.S. It was so successful that British Prime Minister Edward Heath asked for pandas for the United Kingdom during a visit to China in 1974. Pandas Chia-Chia and Ching-Ching arrived at the London Zoo a few weeks later. The pandas gifted to the UK would later be the inspiration for the logo of the World Wildlife Fund.

Lease policy 
In 1984, China's leader Deng Xiaoping modified the policy, such that subsequent pandas would be leased, instead of gifted, beginning with China presenting two pandas to Los Angeles during the 1984 Olympic Games for $50,000 per month per panda. This practice was again modified in 1991 in favor of long-term leases. China began to offer pandas to other nations only on ten-year lease. The standard lease terms include a fee of up to US$1 million per year and a provision that any cubs born during the lease period be the property of the People's Republic of China. Since 1998, because of a World Wildlife Fund lawsuit, the U.S. Fish and Wildlife Service allows a U.S. Zoo to import a panda only if the zoo can ensure that China will channel more than half of its loan fee into conservation efforts for wild pandas and their habitat. The gifting of two pandas to Hong Kong in 2007 was ostensibly an exception to this lease model, but can be seen as outside of the spectrum of panda diplomacy.

After the 2008 Sichuan earthquake that severely damaged many facilities, 60 pandas required new housing. The majority were given to nations that had favorable trade agreements with China, or those that supplied China with necessary resources, such as uranium from Australia.

International recognition 
Other countries recognize the significance of pandas as diplomatic symbols, emblematic of the state of relations with China. During a visit by then Chinese Leader Hu Jintao to Japan in May 2008, China announced the lease of two pandas to Japan. The leader was quoted as saying "Giant pandas are very popular among the Japanese, and they are a symbol of the friendly ties between Japan and China." Treatment of the pandas is likewise associated with the relevant foreign policy. For example, in 1964, British diplomats worried that a transfer of a panda from a London Zoo to Moscow would worsen Sino–Soviet relations. In January 2006, U.S. Deputy Secretary of State Robert Zoellick was photographed hugging a five-month-old panda cub during his visit to Sichuan. The image was widely broadcast by the Chinese media and was purportedly interpreted as a sign that Zoellick supported better relations between China and the United States.

On April 16, 2014, China planned to send a pair of pandas named Fu Wa and Feng Yi to Malaysia to mark their 40-year diplomatic ties but were postponed following the MH370 tragedy. The two pandas later arrived at Kuala Lumpur International Airport on May 21, 2014, and were placed at the National Zoo of Malaysia.

In 2018, Finland agreed to care for two giant pandas following their endorsement of the one-China policy.

Two pandas, Cai Tao and Hu Chun, arrived in Jakarta in 2017 to be placed in Taman Safari in Bogor as part of the 60th anniversary celebrations of China–Indonesia relations.

The most recent panda lease was on June 5, 2019, when Chinese Communist Party (CCP) General Secretary Xi Jinping leased two giant pandas to Russia's Moscow Zoo on an official state visit as a "sign of respect and trust." The pandas include a two-year-old male Ru Yi and a one-year-old female Ding Ding.

Animal health concerns 
In 2003, China sent Thailand a pair of pandas, Chuang Chuang and Lin Hui, to Chiang Mai Zoo. Chuang Chuang was put on a diet in 2007 due to obesity and died in September 2019 as a result of heart failure. The public started to blame this incident on China's panda diplomacy, with many arguing that sending the animals overseas and outside their endemic habitat was detrimental to their health, further exacerbating their population decline.

Upkeep and expenses 
Keeping pandas is very expensive. Beside the cost of the "rent" payable to China, obtaining enough bamboo is very expensive. A panda typically consumes only fresh bamboo, eating 40 kg of it every day. It was reported in 2011 that Edinburgh Zoo spent $107,000 per year to feed its two pandas. This caused the zoo to ask for bamboo donations, as well as for local gardeners to start growing bamboo. During the COVID-19 pandemic, the supply of bamboo added to cost considerations. Owing to the difficulty of securing a consistent and adequate supply of fresh bamboo, Calgary Zoo opted to return their pair of pandas ahead of schedule, to join their progeny back in China.

Copenhagen Zoo opened a panda enclosure in 2019 for two pandas on lease from China for 15 years with the price tag of $1 million annually. The enclosure itself cost $24 million, though it was privately funded.

Offer of pandas to Taiwan

In 2005, Lien Chan, Chairman of the Kuomintang, the then sichuan party in Taiwan, visited mainland China. As part of the talks between Lien and the CCP, two pandas (later named Tuan Tuan and Yuan Yuan, meaning "reunion" in Chinese) were offered as a gift to the people of Taiwan.

While the idea was popular with the Taiwanese public, it was opposed by the Republic of China (ROC) government of Taiwan, then led by the Democratic Progressive Party (DPP), which favors Taiwanese independence and staunchly opposes unification with the People's Republic of China. The gift of pandas was seen as an attempt by the CCP to draw the ROC government into its "united front". While several zoos in Taiwan made bids to host the pandas, the ROC government raised objections, ostensibly on the grounds that pandas were not suited to the Taiwanese climate and that Taiwan did not have the expertise to rear pandas successfully. It was widely understood, however, that these were pretexts underlaid by political considerations by the DPP-led government to maintain its distance from the PRC government. Another technical issue is a dispute over the applicability of the Convention on the International Trade of Endangered Species (CITES). In 1998, China offered the Republic of China two giant pandas in exchange for wartime peace. The PRC insisted that a transfer from mainland China to Taiwan was a domestic transfer, not subject to CITES, while the ROC government disputed this and would not accept the pandas without CITES procedures. On March 11, 2006, the ROC formally rejected the offer, with President Chen Shui-bian explaining in his weekly newsletter, "A-bian (Chen's nickname) sincerely urges the Chinese leaders to leave the giant pandas in their natural habitat, because pandas brought up in cages or given as gifts will not be happy."

Following a change of government in Taiwan, in July 2008, the ROC government led by the Kuomintang stated that it would accept the gift of two four-year-old giant pandas. In December 2008, the government approved the import of pandas under the terms of "species of traditional herbal medicine." Tuan Tuan and Yuan Yuan arrived at Taipei Zoo later in the same month.

In response to the transfer, the CITES Secretariat stated that the transfer of the two pandas was a matter of "internal or domestic trade", and so was not required to be reported to CITES. The ROC quickly issued a rebuttal to the CITES statement and insisted that the country-to-country transfer protocols were respected. The ROC also noted that such procedures would not have been needed if it had been an internal/domestic transfer. The ROC further noted that Taiwan is not a CITES signatory and is therefore not obligated to report to the CITES Secretariat its acceptance of the two pandas.

Other animals as diplomatic gifts
Internationally, other rare animals appear as diplomatic/political gifts as well. For example, in the run-up to the 2008 Beijing Olympic Games, five Chinese sturgeons, symbolising the five Olympic rings, were given by China's Central Government to Hong Kong.

In 2009, the government of the Seychelles Islands announced its gift of a pair of Aldabra giant tortoises to the 2010 World Expo in Shanghai in celebration of the 60th anniversary of the founding of the People's Republic of China, and in appreciation of China assisting the small insular nation with the expenses of participating in the Expo. The two tortoises will be actually kept in Shanghai Zoo.

In response to China's panda diplomacy, French President Emmanuel Macron gifted Xi Jinping one of France's elite cavalry corps’ horses.

The government of Mongolia has a practice of gifting horses to visiting dignitaries. Recipients include President of South Korea Park Geun-hye, Vice President of India Mohammad Hamid Ansari, Prime Minister of India Narendra Modi, and the United States Secretary of Defense Chuck Hagel. A horse was also given by Mongolian President Khaltmaagiin Battulga to Barron Trump, the youngest son of U.S. President Donald Trump. Trump named the horse, "Victory".

The Philippines plans to loan a pair of Philippine eagles to Singapore in 2019 for ten years as an effort to boost ties between the two countries. The Philippine government also considers the move as an "insurance policy" in a bid to protect the endangered species' population in the event an avian outbreak wipes out the indigenous population in the Philippines.

See also 
 Animal rights
 Foreign policy of China
 Ocean Park Hong Kong
 Ping-pong diplomacy
 Richard Nixon's 1972 visit to China
 Stadium diplomacy
 World Wide Fund for Nature

References

External links 
 

Animals as diplomatic gifts
Foreign relations of China
Diplomacy